Crangopsis is an extinct genus of crustacean.

References

Prehistoric Malacostraca
Prehistoric crustacean genera
Fossil taxa described in 1863